Nice and Easy, or Nice 'n' Easy, or similar, may refer to:
 Nice 'n' Easy, a 1960 album by Frank Sinatra
 Nice and Easy (album), a 1962 album led by American jazz vibraphonist Johnny Lytle
 Nice 'n' Easy (Johnny Duncan and Janie Fricke album), 1980 studio album by American country artists Johnny Duncan and Janie Fricke
 Nice 'n' Easy (Houston Person album), 2013
 "Nice and Easy" (Golden Girls episode), an episode of the American television show Golden Girls
 Nice 'n Easy (hair coloring), a shampoo-in permanent hair-coloring

See also 
 "Nice 'n' Sleazy", a 1978 song and single by The Stranglers